Suckleya is a monotypic genus of flowering plant belonging to the family Amaranthaceae. It only contains one known species, Suckleya suckleyana (Torr.) Rydb.

Its native range is western central Canada (within the province of Alberta) to western central and southern central United States (with the states of Colorado, Montana, New Mexico, Texas and Wyoming).

The genus name of Suckleya and the Latin specific epithet of suckleyana is in honour of George Suckley (1830–1869), an American physician and naturalist notable as an explorer of the Washington and Oregon territories in the 1850s, and describer of several new fish species. It was first described and published in Proc. Amer. Acad. Arts Vol.11 on page 103 in 1876. The species was then published in Mem. New York Bot. Gard. Vol.1 on page 133 in 1900.

References

Chenopodioideae
Amaranthaceae genera
Plants described in 1876
Flora of Guyana
Flora of Alberta
Flora of the Northwestern United States
Flora of the South-Central United States
Flora without expected TNC conservation status